Alfred, Lord Tennyson, the first Baron Tennyson, was an English poet.

Tennyson may also refer to:

Art, entertainment, and media

Characters
 Ambrose Tennyson, a character in the novel The Mating Season by PG Wodehouse
 Ben Tennyson, the primary protagonist of the Ben 10 media franchise

Music
 Tennyson (band), Canadian duo band

People
 Baron Tennyson, the barony itself
 Alfred, Lord Tennyson (Alfred Tennyson, 1st Baron Tennyson), poet
 Emily Tennyson, Baroness Tennyson, wife of Alfred Tennyson
 Frederick Tennyson, brother of Alfred Tennyson
 Charles Tennyson Turner, brother of Alfred Tennyson
 Emilia Tennyson, sister of Alfred Tennyson
 Sir Charles Tennyson, British civil servant and industrialist, grandson of Alfred Tennyson
 Pen Tennyson, British film director, great-grandson of Alfred Tennyson
 Julian Tennyson, British writer and historian, great-grandson of Alfred Tennyson
 Hallam Tennyson (radio producer), British radio producer, great-grandson of Alfred Tennyson
 Jonathan Tennyson (car designer), American solar-powered car designer
 Jonathan Tennyson (physicist), British physicist, great-great-grandson of Alfred Tennyson
 Charles Tennyson d'Eyncourt, British politician, uncle of Alfred Tennyson
 Edwin Tennyson d'Eyncourt, British naval officer, first cousin of Alfred Tennyson
 Sir Eustace Tennyson d'Eyncourt, 1st Baronet, British naval architect and engineer, first cousin once removed of Alfred Tennyson
 Sir Gervais Tennyson d'Eyncourt, 2nd Baronet, Fellow of the Royal Society of Arts, first cousin twice removed of Alfred Tennyson
 Hallam Tennyson, 2nd Baron Tennyson, Governor-General of Australia
 Lionel Tennyson, 3rd Baron Tennyson, English cricketer
 Harold Tennyson, 4th Baron Tennyson
 Mark Tennyson, 5th Baron Tennyson 
 David Tennyson, 6th Baron Tennyson
 Eóin Tennyson, Northern Irish politician
 John Tennyson, Irish hurler
 McKinley Tennyson, American soccer forward
 Matt Tennyson, American professional ice hockey defenceman
 Matthew Tennyson, English actor of stage and screen
 Nick Tennyson, former mayor of Durham, North Carolina
 Walter Tennyson, British actor and film director of the silent era
 William J. Tennyson, Jr., American jazz musician
 Tennyson Bardwell, American film and TV commercial director and screenwriter
 Tennyson Cooray (1952-2020), Sri Lankan actor and comedian
 Tennyson Guyer, member of the United States House of Representatives
 Frederick Tennyson Congdon, Canadian politician and lawyer
 Alfred D'Orsay Tennyson Dickens, son of Charles Dickens
 Steve Dick Tennyson Matenje, Malawian civil servant and permanent representative
 Horace Tennyson O'Rourke, Dublin city architect for 88 Corporation
 B. Tennyson Sebastian II, American sound engineer
 Walter Tennyson Swingle, American agricultural botanist

Places

Australia
 Tennyson, Queensland
 Tennyson railway station, Brisbane
 Tennyson, New South Wales
 Tennyson, South Australia
 Tennyson, Victoria
 Tennyson Point, New South Wales

New Zealand
 Tennyson Inlet

United Kingdom
 Tennyson Down

United States of America
 Tennyson, Indiana
 Tennyson, Texas
 Tennyson, Wisconsin

Ships

See also
 Tenison